"Toy Train" is a country, pop, and rock song written by American Dewayne Blackwell and first performed by Northern Rhodesian-born John Edmond. The song upon release on 13 April 1973 spent 18 weeks on the South African music charts (Springbok Radio Top 20), peaking at number 6; it was Edmond's highest charting single in South Africa. It entered the Rhodesian charts on 2 June, peaking at number 14 in four weeks.

References

External links 

 

Songs about trains
Songs written by Dewayne Blackwell
1973 songs
South African songs
Rhodesian songs